Shalimar is a Bollywood film directed by Roop K. Shorey. It was released in 1946. The cast included Chandra Mohan, Begum Para, Manorama, Nisar, Parmila and Manju.

Cast

Male 
 A. L. Nasir (Murad)
 Harsha (Asif Khan)
 Chandra Mohan (Jehangir)

Female 
 Manorama (Taji)
 Pramela (Shali)
 Begum Para (Nurjehan)

References

External links
 

1946 films
1940s Hindi-language films
Indian black-and-white films